The Vyros Gorge is a deep river gorge situated in the 'Outer Mani' region of the Peloponnese in southern Greece. It runs from the foot of Profitis Ilias (the highest mountain of the Taygetus range) to Kardamyli. In Summer it remains bone dry, however in winter it is known to flood spectacularly, turning into a river which often carries debris such as tree branches and rocks to its mouth in the town of Kardamili, where it empties into the Messenian Gulf, a part of the Ionian Sea.

The gorge has several walking paths, which connect to nearby monasteries.

References

Mani Peninsula
Canyons and gorges of Greece
Landforms of Peloponnese (region)